Azadeh Kian-Thiébaut (born 1958) is an Iranian-French academic, Professor of Sociology, Director of the Social Sciences department and Director of the Center for Gender and Feminist Studies at the University of Paris. She is included and recognized in the BBC project 100 Women.

Biography
From 1987 to 1990, Kian was a lecturer in political sociology at UCLA. In 1995 she joined the faculty of University Paris III, and later the University of Paris VIII Saint Denis. She is a research expert on Iranian and Maghreb studies, and is a researcher for the Iranian laboratory CNRS. Notable works include Avoir vingt ans en Iran (Alternatives, 1999), Les femmes iraniennes entre islam État et famille  (Maisonneuve & Larose, 2002) and La République islamique d'Iran : de la maison du Guide à la raison d'État (Michalon, 2005). In 1996 she published the article Des femmes iraniennes contre le clergé: islamistes et laiques pour la premiere fois unies in Le Monde diplomatique, and in 2010 she published the article Islamic Feminism in Iran: A New Form of Subjugation or the Emergence of Agency? in Critique internationale journal. In her works, she is critical of Islamic laws (shari'a) in Muslim countries and sees them as a threat to women's rights of equality.

The Servizio d’informatione religiosa (SIR) defined her “the most listened woman of the Iranian diaspora”.

Activism

She is among the most consulted Iranian diaspora women in the world to comment the social and political evolutions of her native country. 

She described the moment of the death of Mahsa Amini as a turning point where civil society openly contradicts Iranian power (“What's unprecedented about these protests is that women are leading the chargel”) and she delivered a pitch as invited guest in the European Parliament in october 2022 after a meeting with European Parliament President Roberta Metsola. She spoke at Les Echos Belgium about talebanization of power in Iran.  In November 2022, she affirmed that the crisis in Iran is a revolution aiming to change the regime, and not just a protest from civil society.

Publications 
Thiébaut, Azadeh. Secularization of Iran: a Doomed Failure? The New Middle Class and the Making of Modern Iran (Travaux et memoires de l'Institut d'Etudes iraniennes). Leuven: Peeters Publishers, 1998. 
Thiébaut, Azadeh. Les femmes iraniennes entre islam, Etat et famille. Paris: Maisonneuve et Larose, 2002. 
Eshraghi, Isabelle, Azadeh Thiébaut Thiébaut, and Seyyed E. Nabavi. Avoir 20 ans à Téhéran. Paris: Ed. Alternatives, 1999.

References

1958 births
Living people
Iranian sociologists
Iranian feminists
Iranian women academics
Iranian women sociologists
Academic staff of the University of Paris
Iranian emigrants to France
BBC 100 Women
Iranian expatriate academics